Henry Acquah (born 31 August 1965) is a former Ghanaian football forward.

Career

Acquah in 1989 played with Hearts of Oak then moved to Germany and played with Preußen Münster in the Second Division while becoming an audience favorite. During the time he played to the descent of the club in the then third-class league Westfalen two years later and played 43 club games.

There followed several years in the lower division clubs SpVgg Marl, VfB Wissen and Alemannia Aachen. In 1997, after a year at the Malaysian club Perlis FA, Acquah ended his career.

References

External links
 

1965 births
Living people
Ghanaian footballers
Association football forwards
Accra Hearts of Oak S.C. players
SC Preußen Münster players
VfB Wissen players
Alemannia Aachen players
Perlis FA players
2. Bundesliga players
Ghanaian expatriate footballers
Ghanaian expatriate sportspeople in Germany
Ghanaian expatriate sportspeople in Malaysia
Expatriate footballers in Germany
Expatriate footballers in Malaysia
Ghana Premier League top scorers